Thaba-Tseka Airport  is an airport serving the town of Thaba-Tseka, the camptown of Thaba-Tseka District, Lesotho.

See also
Transport in Lesotho
List of airports in Lesotho

References

External links
 OurAirports - Thaba-Tseka
OpenStreetMap - Thaba-Tseka
 Thaba-Tseka Airport
 Google Earth

Airports in Lesotho